Lobsang Rampa was the pen name of Cyril Henry Hoskin (8 April 1910 – 25 January 1981), an author who wrote books with paranormal and occult themes. His best known work is The Third Eye, published in Britain in 1956.

Following the publication of the book, newspapers reported that Rampa had been born Cyril Henry Hoskin, and was a plumber from Plympton in Devon who claimed that his body hosted the spirit of a Tibetan lama going by the name of Tuesday Lobsang Rampa, who is purported to have authored the books. The name Tuesday relates to a claim in The Third Eye that Tibetans are named after the day of the week on which they were born.

The Third Eye
Rampa's book The Third Eye was published in November 1956 in the United Kingdom. The book purported to relate Rampa's experiences while growing up in Chakpori Lamasery, Chokpori, Tibet, after being sent there at the age of seven. The title of the book is derived from an operation, similar to trepanation, that Rampa claimed he had undergone, in which a small hole was drilled into his forehead to arouse the third eye and enhance powers of clairvoyance. The book describes the operation as follows:

During the story, Rampa sees yetis and eventually encounters a mummified body of himself from an earlier incarnation. He also takes part in an initiation ceremony in which he learns that during its early history the Earth was struck by another planet, causing Tibet to become the mountain kingdom that it is today.

The manuscript of The Third Eye had been turned down by several leading British publishers before being accepted by Secker and Warburg for an advance of £800 (£ today). Fredric Warburg of Secker and Warburg had met the book's author, who at the time appeared in the guise of "Doctor Carl Kuon Suo". Intrigued by the writer's personality, Warburg sent the manuscript to a number of scholars, several of whom expressed doubts about its authenticity. Nevertheless, the book was published in November 1956 and soon became a global bestseller. The Times Literary Supplement said of the book: "It came near to being a work of art."

Controversy over authorship

Explorer and Tibetologist Heinrich Harrer was unconvinced about the book's origins and hired a private detective from Liverpool named Clifford Burgess to investigate Rampa. "In January 1957, Scotland Yard asked him to present a Tibetan passport or a residence permit. Rampa moved to Ireland. One year later, the scholars retained the services of Clifford Burgess, a leading Liverpool private detective. Burgess's report, when it came in, was terse. Lama Lobsang Rampa of Tibet, he determined after one month of inquiries, was none other than Cyril Henry Hoskin, a native of Plympton, Devonshire, the son of the village plumber and a high school dropout." The findings of Burgess' investigation were published in the Daily Mail in February 1958. Hoskin had never been to Tibet and spoke no Tibetan. In 1948, he had legally changed his name to Carl Kuon Suo before adopting the name Lobsang Rampa. An obituary of Fra Andrew Bertie, Grand Master of the Sovereign Military Order of Malta, claims that he was involved in unmasking Lobsang Rampa as a West Country plumber.

Rampa was tracked by the British press to Howth, Ireland, and confronted with these allegations. He did not deny that he had been born as Cyril Hoskin, but claimed that his body was now occupied by the spirit of Lobsang Rampa. According to the account given in his third book, The Rampa Story, he had fallen out of a fir tree in his garden in Thames Ditton, Surrey, while attempting to photograph an owl. He was concussed and, on regaining his senses, had seen a Buddhist monk in saffron robes walking towards him. The monk spoke to him about Rampa taking over his body and Hoskin agreed, saying that he was dissatisfied with his current life. When Rampa's original body became too worn out to continue (following the events of his second book Doctor From Lhasa where, as a doctor in charge, he was questioned and tortured to the brink of death by the Japanese after being seized in the advance following the capture of Nanning as part of the Battle of South Guangxi), he took over Hoskin's body in a process of transmigration of the soul.

Rampa maintained for the rest of his life that The Third Eye was a true story. In the foreword to the 1964 edition of the book, he wrote: "I am Tuesday Lobsang Rampa, that is my only name, now my legal name, and I answer to no other."

To Donald S. Lopez, Jr., an American Tibetologist, the books of Lobsang Rampa are "the works of an unemployed surgical fitter, the son of a plumber, seeking to support himself as a ghostwriter."

The authorship controversy was dramatised in a radio play, The Third Eye and the Private Eye, by David Lemon and Mark Ecclestone, first broadcast by BBC Radio 4 in August 2012.

Influence on Tibetologists' callings
Donald S. Lopez, Jr., in Prisoners of Shangri-La (1998), points out that when discussing Rampa with other Tibetologists and Buddhologists in Europe, he found that The Third Eye was the first book many of them had read about Tibet: "For some it was a fascination with the world Rampa described that had led them to become professional scholars of Tibet."

Lopez adds that when he gave The Third Eye to a class of his at the University of Michigan without telling them about its history, the "students were unanimous in their praise of the book, and despite six prior weeks of lectures and readings on Tibetan history and religion, [...] they found it entirely credible and compelling, judging it more realistic than anything they had previously read about Tibet."

Role in the Tibetan cause 
Lobsang Rampa was a supporter of the Tibetan cause despite criticism of his books. In 1972, Rampa's French language agent Alain Stanké wrote to the Dalai Lama and asked for his opinion about Rampa's identity. He received a reply from the Dalai Lama's deputy secretary stating "I wish to inform you that we do not place credence in the books written by the so-called Dr. T. Lobsang Rampa. His works are highly imaginative and fictional in nature." The Dalai Lama had previously admitted that although the books were fictitious, they had created good publicity for Tibet.

Later career
Lobsang Rampa went on to write another 18 books containing a mixture of religious and occult material. One of the books, Living with the Lama, was described as being dictated to Rampa by his pet Siamese cat, Mrs. Fifi Greywhiskers. Faced with repeated accusations from the British press that he was a charlatan and a con artist, Rampa went to live in Canada in the 1960s. He and his wife, San Ra'ab, became Canadian citizens in 1973, along with Sheelagh Rouse (Buttercup) who was his secretary and regarded by Rampa as his adopted daughter.

Lobsang Rampa died in Calgary on 25 January 1981, at the age of 70.

Writings

 The Third Eye (1956)
 My Visit to Venus (1957)
 Doctor from Lhasa (1959)
 The Rampa Story (1960)
 Cave of the Ancients (1963)
 Living with the Lama (1964)
 You Forever (1965)
 Wisdom of the Ancients (1965)
 The Saffron Robe (1966)
 Chapters of Life (1967)
 Beyond The Tenth (1969)
 Feeding the Flame (1971)
 The Hermit (1971)
 The Thirteenth Candle (1972)
 Candlelight (1973)
 Twilight (1975)
 As It Was! (1976)
 I Believe (1976)
 Three Lives (1977)
 Tibetan Sage (1980)

See also
 Grey Owl
 Mediumship
 Third eye
 Trepanation

Notes

References

Further reading
Lobsang Rampa — New Age Trailblazer by Karen Mutton. 
Newnham, Richard (1991). The Guinness Book of Fakes, Frauds and Forgeries. 
Prisoners of Shangri-La: Tibetan Buddhism and the West by Donald S. Lopez Jr., 

Books by Sheelagh Rouse (alias Buttercup)

 25 years with T. Lobsang Rampa (2005) 
 Grace, The World of Rampa (2007)

External links

Excerpts from Rampa's writings, advocacy of his views
 Tuesday Lobsang Rampa Multilingual website in 36 languages, including a very comprehensive book lists for Rampa, Sheelagh, and Ra'ab.
T. Lobsang Rampa – extracts from his writings
LobsangRampa.net  – website maintained by followers of Rampa, containing links to a mailgroup and other Rampa-themed websites

Criticism/scepticism

 .

1910 births
1981 deaths
British spiritual writers
Canadian spiritual writers
English emigrants to Canada
New Age writers
Paranormal hoaxes
Pseudohistorians
Literary forgeries
Impostors
Hoaxes in the United Kingdom
1950s hoaxes
Tibet freedom activists